The 2003–04 FA Premier League (known as the FA Barclaycard Premiership) was the 12th season of the Premier League. Arsenal were crowned champions ending the season without a single defeat – the first team ever to do so in a 38-game league season. Chelsea finished second to Arsenal.

Season summary

Having qualified for the Champions League the previous season, Chelsea were bolstered by a £100 million outlay on world-class players, a spree funded by the extensive financial resources of their new owner Roman Abramovich. Manchester United's attack was as strong as ever thanks to free-scoring Ruud van Nistelrooy, but the midfield was weakened following the £25 million pre-season sale of David Beckham to Real Madrid, and the centre of defence suffered a more severe setback after Rio Ferdinand was ruled out for the final four months of the season after being found guilty of the "failure or refusal to take a drugs test". The case of Rio Ferdinand started a debate about punishments relating to drug testing in football, with there being differing views on whether the punishment was too harsh or too lenient. Ferdinand's club sought to make direct comparisons with an earlier case of Manchester City reserve player who had in fact committed a lesser drug testing offence and as a result escaped with only a fine. City themselves had just moved from Maine Road to the City of Manchester Stadium.

Arsenal, meanwhile, had only signed German goalkeeper Jens Lehmann in the 2003 close season, but French striker Thierry Henry was instrumental in Arsenal's success. Away from the Premier League, Arsène Wenger's team suffered disappointment in the cup competitions. They were knocked-out by League Cup eventual winners Middlesbrough in the semi-finals. They lost their grip on the FA Cup (which they held for two seasons in a row) after being defeated by eventual winners Manchester United in the semi-final. Arsenal were knocked out of the Champions League quarter-finals by Chelsea (3–2 on aggregate). These blows in the FA Cup and Champions League came within a few days of each other, and it was feared that Arsenal might squander their lead of the Premier League for the second successive season, but Arsenal easily defeated Liverpool only days later. 

The 2003/04 Premier League season saw Arsène Wenger lead the North-London club to a first undefeated season, solidifying his managerial legacy and longevity to the Arsenal fanbase as they finished the season with 26 wins, 12 draws, 0 defeats and 90 points; the tied-tenth highest points tally ever seen in a premier league season, winning with an 11-point margin to Claudio Ranieri's Chelsea. Thierry Henry proved decisive in the critical moments, inspiring comebacks against close rivals Liverpool and Chelsea, including a hat-trick to seal a 4-2 win from being 2-1 down initially.

The relegation spots were occupied by three teams bracketed together on 33 points. Wolves and Leicester City followed the trend of many other newly promoted Premier League clubs and were relegated just one season after reaching the top division. For Leicester City, they would not return to the top flight for another 10 years and became the league champions for the first time ever in their history just a season later, whilst Wolves had been promoted back to the top flight in 2009 and slipped down again 3 years later. The other relegation place went to Leeds United, whose playing fortunes had dipped in the past two seasons after David O'Leary was sacked as manager and club debts had risen so high that many star players had to be sold. As a result, Leeds were relegated from the Premier League after 14 years of top division football – just three seasons after they had reached the Champions League semifinals, and they would not return for another 16 years.

In his third season as Middlesbrough manager, Steve McClaren had guided the Teessiders to their first ever major trophy – sealed with a 2–1 win over Bolton Wanderers in the League Cup final. McClaren was also the first English manager to win a major trophy since Brian Little guided Aston Villa to League Cup success in 1996. He was also the first manager to take Middlesbrough into European competition – they would be competing in the 2004–05 UEFA Cup.

Teams
Twenty teams competed in the league – the top seventeen teams from the previous season and the three teams promoted from the First Division. The promoted teams were Portsmouth, Leicester City and Wolverhampton Wanderers, returning to the top flight after an absence of fifteen, one and nineteen years respectively. This was also both Portsmouth and Wolverhampton Wanderers' first season in the Premier League. They replaced West Ham United, West Bromwich Albion and Sunderland after spending time in the top flight for ten, one and four years respectively.

Stadiums and locations

Personnel and kits

Managerial changes

League table

Season statistics

Results

Overall
Most wins – Arsenal (26)
Fewest wins – Leicester City (6)
Most draws – Newcastle United (17)
Fewest draws – Manchester United and Tottenham Hotspur (6)
Most losses – Leeds United (21)
Fewest losses – Arsenal (0)
Most goals scored – Arsenal (73)
Fewest goals scored – Wolverhampton Wanderers (38)
Most goals conceded – Leeds United (79)
Fewest goals conceded – Arsenal (26)

Top scorers

Awards

Monthly awards

Annual awards

LMA Manager of the Year
The LMA Manager of the Year award was won by Arsène Wenger.

PFA Players' Player of the Year
The PFA Players' Player of the Year award for 2004 was won by Thierry Henry of Arsenal for the second successive year.

The shortlist for the PFA Players' Player of the Year award was as follows:
Steven Gerrard (Liverpool)
Thierry Henry (Arsenal)
Frank Lampard (Chelsea)
Jay-Jay Okocha (Bolton Wanderers)
Alan Shearer (Newcastle United)
Patrick Vieira (Arsenal)

PFA Young Player of the Year
The PFA Young Player of the Year award was won by Scott Parker of Chelsea F.C.

The shortlist for the award was as follows:
Glen Johnson (Chelsea)
Scott Parker (Charlton Athletic/Chelsea)
Wayne Rooney (Everton)
John Terry (Chelsea)
Kolo Touré (Arsenal)
Shaun Wright-Phillips (Manchester City)

PFA Team of the Year

Goalkeeper: Tim Howard (Manchester United)Defence: Lauren, Ashley Cole, Sol Campbell (all Arsenal), John Terry (Chelsea)Midfield: Steven Gerrard (Liverpool), Patrick Vieira, Robert Pires (both Arsenal), Frank Lampard (Chelsea)Attack: Thierry Henry (Arsenal), Ruud van Nistelrooy (Manchester United)

PFA Fans' Player of the Year
Thierry Henry of Arsenal was named the PFA Fans' Player of the Year for the second consecutive year. Henry was the first player to win this award twice.

FWA Footballer of the Year
The FWA Footballer of the Year award for 2004 was won by Thierry Henry. The Arsenal forward picked up a remarkable 87% of the votes.

Premier League Fair Play Award
The Premier League Fair Play Award merit is given to the team who has been the most sporting and best behaved team. Champions Arsenal won this.

Behaviour of the Public League
Given to the best-behaved fans, Arsenal won this, thus achieving a fair play double.

Premier League Manager of the Year
Arsène Wenger won the Premier League Manager of the Year award. His team won 26 games, losing none and drawing 12 scoring 73 goals, conceding 26.

See also
2003–04 in English football

References

External links
2003–04 FA Premier League Season at RSSSF

 
Premier League seasons
Eng
1